The 1975 All-Ireland Minor Hurling Championship was the 45th staging of the All-Ireland Minor Hurling Championship since its establishment by the Gaelic Athletic Association in 1928. The championship began on 9 May 1975 and ended on 7 September 1975.

Cork entered the championship as the defending champions.

On 7 September 1975, Kilkenny won the championship following a 3-19 to 1-14 defeat of Cork in the All-Ireland final. This was their 10th All-Ireland title overall and their first title since 1973.

Cork's John O'Sullivan was the championship's top scorer with 1-32.

Results

Leinster Minor Hurling Championship

Semi-finals

Final

Munster Minor Hurling Championship

First round

Semi-finals

Final

All-Ireland Minor Hurling Championship

Quarter-final

Semi-final

Final

Championship statistics

Top scorers

Top scorers overall

External links
 All-Ireland Minor Hurling Championship: Roll Of Honour

Minor
All-Ireland Minor Hurling Championship